Roberto Ríos Patus (born 8 October 1971) is a Spanish retired professional footballer who played as a central defender.

Club career
Although Basque-born (in Bilbao), Ríos emerged through the youth system of Real Betis, making his professional debut in the Segunda División in the 1992–93 season. He went on to contribute importantly in the Andalusians' promotion the following year – although appearing in only 19 matches he scored four times – and become a regular first-team member onwards.

In summer 1997, following rumours of a transfer to Manchester United earlier in February, Ríos was signed by Athletic Bilbao for 2 billion pesetas, a then-record for a national player. In his first season, he netted twice in 32 games (including once in a 5–1 home thrashing of CP Mérida, on 21 December 1997) as the Basque side finished runners-up in La Liga.
 
After spending the first months of the 2002–03 campaign without a club and having totalled only 27 appearances in his last three years at Athletic, Ríos trained with West Bromwich Albion. However, in January 2003 he rejected a contract offer from the Gary Megson-led team, stating "I don't want to fool anyone" about his chances of regaining full fitness.

Ríos retired aged 30, due to persistent injury problems. He returned to Betis in 2010, as part of newly appointed manager Pepe Mel's coaching staff.

International career
Ríos was capped 11 times by Spain, with his debut coming on 9 October 1996 in a 0–0 away draw with the Czech Republic in the 1998 FIFA World Cup qualifiers. In spite of having appeared significantly during the campaign and coming from a solid club season with Athletic, he was overlooked for the final stages in France.

Personal life
Ríos' father, Eusebio, was also a footballer (and a defender). He too played most of his career at Betis, and later became a coach, also managing the team.

Honours
Spain U21
UEFA European Championship third place: 1994

References

External links

1971 births
Living people
Spanish footballers
Footballers from Bilbao
Association football defenders
La Liga players
Segunda División players
Segunda División B players
Betis Deportivo Balompié footballers
Real Betis players
Athletic Bilbao footballers
Spain youth international footballers
Spain under-21 international footballers
Spain international footballers
Basque Country international footballers
Spanish expatriate sportspeople in England
West Bromwich Albion F.C. non-playing staff